The 2nd Division was a unit of the Reichswehr.

Creation 
In the Order of 31 July 1920 for the Reduction of the Army (to comply with the upper limits on the size of the military contained in the Treaty of Versailles), it was determined that in every Wehrkreis (military district) a division would be established by 1 October 1920. The 2nd Division was formed in January 1921 out of the Reichswehr-Brigaden 2 and 9, both part of the former Übergangsheer (Transition Army).

It consisted of 3 infantry regiments, the 4th, 5th, and 6th. It also consisted of the 2nd artillery regiment, an engineering battalion, a signals battalion, a transportation battalion and a medical battalion.

The commander of the Wehrkreis II was simultaneously the commander of the 2nd Division.
For the leadership of the troops, an Infanterieführer and an Artillerieführer were appointed, both subordinated to the commander of the Division.

Organization 

 4. Infanterie-Regiment
 5. Infanterie-Regiment
 6. Infanterie-Regiment
 2. Artillerie-Regiment
 Pioneer Battalion
 Signals Battalion
 Transportation Battalion
 Medical Battalion

Commanding officers 
 General der Infanterie Erich Weber Pascha (01.10.1920 - 16.06.1921)
 General der Infanterie Hans Freiherr von Hammerstein-Gesmold (16.06.1921 - 01.02.1923)
 General der Infanterie Erich von Tschischwitz (01.02.1923 - 01.02.1927)
 General der Infanterie Joachim vom Amsberg (01.02.1927 - 30.09.1929)
 General der Infanterie Rudolf Schniewindt (01.10.1929 - 30.09.1931)
 Generalleutnant Fedor von Bock (01.10.1931 - 01.04.1935)

Notable Infanterieführers 
 Generalleutnant Waldemar Erfurth (01.10.1929 - 30.09.1931)
 Generalleutnant Wilhelm Ulex (01.08.1935 - 15.10.1935)

Notable Artillerieführer 
  Generalmajor	Werner von Fritsch (01.03.1930 - 30.09.1931)

The unit ceased to exist as such after October 1934, and its subordinate units were transferred to one of the 21 Divisions newly created in that year.

Garrisons 
The divisional headquarters was in Stettin.

Infantry divisions of Germany
Military units and formations established in 1920
Military units and formations disestablished in 1934